Anderson Cooper 360° (commonly shortened to either AC-360 or 360) is an American television news show on CNN and CNN International, hosted by CNN journalist and news anchor Anderson Cooper.

Since May 20, 2019, 360° has been broadcast live from CNN's set in Studio 21L at CNN's offices in 30 Hudson Yards in New York City. It is also sometimes broadcast from CNN's studios in Washington, D.C. or from the site of a breaking news event, airing Monday through Friday evenings.

The show currently airs weeknights live from 8:00 pm to 9:00 pm ET, originally from Time Warner Center in New York City, and since late 2019 from its new studios at Time Warner's new base at 30 Hudson Yards, also in New York City. A few editions are also broadcast from CNN's studios in Washington, D.C.

Beginnings
360° was launched on September 8, 2003, as a laid-back news/talk program running for one hour at 7:00pm ET. During Hurricane Katrina and its aftermath, CNN executives noticed an impressive ratings boost of NewsNight due to Cooper's on-site reporting and growing popularity. The executives decided to cancel NewsNight and expand 360° to two hours on November 7, 2005. In August 2011, the show was moved up to 8:00pm ET while maintaining a replay of the show at its original 10:00pm ET time slot.

In June 2013, however, CNN decided to stop airing regular repeats of the show, with the 10:00pm ET time slot featuring its spin-off show, AC360° Later, which featured panel discussions on recent events led by Cooper. After being faced with irregular and inconsistent scheduling (sometimes being replaced by CNN documentaries or re-runs of AC360° from earlier in the day), it was finally discontinued in February 2014.

Format
The show is simulcast live on both CNN and CNN International.

Cooper often anchors the program from the site of a major news story, such as his extensive coverage from New Orleans and the Gulf Coast in the aftermath of Hurricane Katrina and the BP oil spill, as well as Port-au-Prince after the 2010 Haiti earthquake, and also from the storm zone in Tacloban, Leyte, during the aftermath of Super Typhoon Haiyan.

On September 26, 2007, 360° began broadcasting in high definition on CNN HD.

Frequent analysts and contributors to the show include CNN's Chief National Correspondent John King, Chief Political Correspondent Dana Bash, Senior Political Analyst David Gergen, Senior Washington Correspondent Joe Johns, David Mattingly, Investigative Reporters Randi Kaye and Gary Tuchman, Special Investigations reporter Drew Griffin, and Legal Analyst Jeff Toobin.  Other contributors include Josh Campbell, truTV's legal analyst Lisa Bloom, terrorism expert Peter Bergen, Senior International Correspondent Nic Robertson, and addiction medicine specialist Dr. Drew Pinsky. King, The Situation Room host Wolf Blitzer, Chief Medical Correspondent Sanjay Gupta, Chief Washington Correspondent Jake Tapper, Chief National Security Correspondent Jim Sciutto,  and New Day co-anchor John Berman frequently serve as the fill-in presenters when Cooper is not available.

The show was first aired on CNN Philippines during its Paris attacks coverage of their parent network on November 14, 2015 (8:00 am local time), via a hook-up from the CNN/U.S. feed, and started to air during its Breaking News via a hook-up from CNN International starting 2016. Eventually, AC 360° added to its local programming on August 22, 2016, as a dry-run, but was reduced to 30 minutes, giving way for Cebuano News. A week after, it was removed in the network's local programming lineup, due to CNN's initial refusal to air AC 360° on CNN Philippines. However, after the local Newsroom edition on weekday mornings went off the air indefinitely on March 17, 2020, during the COVID-19 pandemic in the Philippines, AC 360° was reinstated as a one-hour program to fill the 8:00 am slot when CNN Philippines went back on-air on March 23, with replays at 11:00 am on Tuesdays till Fridays with Saturday episodes at 10:00.

On November 2, 2020, the show was moved to 10:00 am on four-day weekdays and the 11:00 am replays were discarded, then it was moved again to 10:30 am on June 1, 2021, after CNN Philippines Sports Desk went back on the air after a 14-month hiatus, but as a morning show. AC 360° on Saturdays was also shifted to 10:30 am on June 19.

Segments
 "360 Bulletin" appeared at the top and bottom of the hour and was most recently presented by Amara Walker, who provided a quick review of other top news stories. The segment is no longer included in most broadcasts. Previous presenters have included Isha Sesay and Erica Hill.
 "Crime and Punishment" presented the background and latest developments of high-profile crimes. This segment has been included only minimally since 2011.
 "Keeping Them Honest" exposes possible issues of government corruption, failed promises, and other anomalies from various sectors.
 "The Ridiculist" presents more lighthearted and humorous stories and often airs near the end of the program. (Cooper has dissolved into extended fits of giggles at least twice during this segment: on August 17, 2011, when joking about Gérard Depardieu urinating in a plane, and on April 10, 2012, during a spot about Dyngus Day.) The segment has only appeared sporadically.

Supplements to the TV show
The CNN website and its AC360 section provides visitors segments and video clips of previous episodes and interviews. A podcast version of each broadcast was available for download through 2012, in which Cooper recorded a new introduction before playing clips from the main broadcast. That feature was subsequently phased out.

Recognition

In 2006, 360° was nominated twice for a GLAAD Media Award in the category of "Outstanding TV Journalism – News Segment." The nominated segments were "School Outing" and "Secret Sex Lives." In 2006, the show has won the following News & Documentary Emmy Awards:
 Outstanding Live Coverage of a Breaking News Story Long Form for the report Starving in Plain Sight on the famine in Nigeria
 Outstanding Feature Story in a Regularly Scheduled Newscast for the report on Charity Hospital

The show also won the following Business & Financial Reporting Emmy Award in 2006:
 Outstanding Coverage of a Current Business News Story In a Regularly Scheduled Newscast for the report on Black Market Infertility

The show was nominated but did not win in 2007 for the following News & Documentary Emmy Awards:
 Outstanding Live Coverage of a Breaking News Story – Long Form for the report on Sago Mines.
 Outstanding Individual Achievement in a Craft: Lighting Direction & Scenic Design for the report High Rise Crash

The show won in 2007 for the following Business & Financial Reporting Emmy Awards:
 Outstanding Coverage of a Current Business News Story in a Regularly Scheduled Newscast for the report on Keeping Them Honest – Hidden Spending.

The show received two more nominations in 2008 but did not win:
 Outstanding Feature Story in a Regularly Scheduled Newscast for the report Unapproved Drugs
 Outstanding Investigative Journalism in a Regularly Scheduled Newscast for the report Chicago Police Brutality

In 2010, Anderson Cooper 360° was nominated for a GLAAD Media Award for "Outstanding TV Journalism – Newsmagazine" for the episode "Bullied to Death?" during the 21st GLAAD Media Awards.

In 2011, AC360 won two Emmys for their coverage of the earthquake in Haiti:
 Outstanding coverage of a breaking news story in a regularly scheduled newscast, Haiti in ruins
 Outstanding live coverage of a current news story – long form, crisis in Haiti

References

External links
 
 

2003 American television series debuts
2000s American television talk shows
2010s American television talk shows
2020s American television talk shows
Anderson Cooper
CNN original programming
English-language television shows
Maria Moors Cabot Prize winners
American live television series
Television shows filmed in New York City